"Duet" is a 1957 (©1958) big band swing composition and arrangement by Neal Hefti that was part of his larger body of work for the Count Basie Orchestra. His arrangement features two muted trumpets, which – when first recorded in 1957 on The Atomic Mr. Basie – featured Thad Jones and Joe Newman.

Discography and videography

Discography

Videography

Sheet and folio music, arrangements and transcriptions 
 Fake books
 Music of Neal Hefti: Fake Book (3 Vols., E, B, C), Warner Bros. Music (1991); 
 For E instruments: 
 For B instruments: 
 For concert pitch instruments: 

 See: Real Book

 Note: By inclusion of the "Duet" lead sheet in jazz oriented fake books, one might infer that it is a jazz standard, or one might infer that the editor or publisher is offering it as such.

 Solo instruments
 Neal Hefti Originals for Piano, Neal Hefti Music (1966); 

 Big band
 For big band, transcription of Hefti's arrangement by Jon Harpin (©1986); includes transcribed solos of Joe Newman and Thad Jones from the Basie's 1957 Atomic album.
 Encino Music, USA, Warner / Chappel Music Ltd., London, reproduced by permission of International Music Publications Ltd.
 2 E altos, 2 B tenors, 1 E bari; 4 B trumpets; 2 B tenor trombones, 1 B bass trombone, 1 optional B tenor trombone; guitar, piano, bass, drums with brushes
 Moderate blues in E     = 96 Swing

Notes and references

Notes

References 

Jazz songs
Swing jazz standards
1950s jazz standards
Jazz compositions
Jazz compositions in C minor